Jack Draper (1892–1962) was an American cinematographer. He worked in Mexico for most of his career, where he was a leading film worker of the Golden Age of Mexican cinema.

Selected filmography
 Pony Express Rider (1926)
 Across the Plains (1928)
 Cheyenne Trails (1928)
 Jazzland (1928)
 Trails of Treachery (1928)
 The Phantom (1931)
 Here's the Point (1940)
 In the Times of Don Porfirio (1940)
 I'm a Real Mexican (1942)
 Simón Bolívar (1942)
 Romeo and Juliet (1943)
 The Two Orphans (1944)
 My Memories of Mexico (1944)
 Mischievous Susana (1945)
 I Am a Fugitive (1946)
 Ramona (1946)
 Fly Away, Young Man! (1947)
 Over the Waves (1950)
 Kill Me Because I'm Dying! (1951)
 Full Speed Ahead (1951)
 What Has That Woman Done to You? (1951)
 The Night Falls (1952)
 The Atomic Fireman (1952)
 Tehuantepec (1954)
 Acapulco (1956)
 Puss Without Boots (1957)
 A Thousand and One Nights (1958)
 The Phantom of the Operetta (1960)
 To Each His Life (1960)
 Three Black Angels (1960)
 Love in the Shadows (1960)
 Don Quixote de Orson Welles (1992)

References

Bibliography 
 Charles Ramírez Berg. The Classical Mexican Cinema: The Poetics of the Exceptional Golden Age Films. University of Texas Press, 2015.

External links 
 

1892 births
1962 deaths
American cinematographers
American emigrants to Mexico